Joola may refer to:

 MV Le Joola, a ferry that capsized in Senegal in 2002
 Jola people, an ethnic group of West Africa
 Jola languages